The following is a complete list of Tennessee Volunteers football seasons through the 2021 season.

Seasons

References

Tennessee

Tennessee Volunteers football seasons